Sergio Armando Chávez Dávalos (born 31 October 1974) is a Mexican politician affiliated with the PRI. He currently serves as Deputy of the LXII Legislature of the Mexican Congress representing Jalisco. He also served as Deputy during the LIX Legislature.

References 

1974 births
Living people
21st-century Mexican politicians
Institutional Revolutionary Party politicians
Universidad Autónoma de Guadalajara alumni
Members of the Congress of Jalisco
Deputies of the LXII Legislature of Mexico
Members of the Chamber of Deputies (Mexico) for Jalisco